Long Grove is a village in Lake County, Illinois, United States, approximately  away from and a northwest suburb of Chicago. Per the 2020 census, the population was 8,366. The village has strict building ordinances to preserve its "country atmosphere".

Geography

History
The village now has very strict building ordinances to preserve its "pristine rural charm", including prohibitions on sidewalks, fences, and residential street lights.  The Long Grove area is now known for its historic downtown, its exclusive million dollar homes and the annual events including the chocolate, strawberry and apple festivals that take place in May, June and September, respectively. The Robert Parker Coffin Bridge, on the edge of the city's downtown, is a historic 1906 bridge that is featured on the Long Grove's logo and welcome signs. Due to the  clearance height of its covering, it has been struck by vehicles dozens of times in recent years.

Demographics

2020 census

Note: the US Census treats Hispanic/Latino as an ethnic category. This table excludes Latinos from the racial categories and assigns them to a separate category. Hispanics/Latinos can be of any race.

2000 Census
At the 2000 census there were 6,735 people, 1,962 households, and 1,791 families in the village. The racial makeup of the village was 90.81% White, 0.94% African American, 0.01% Native American, 6.77% Asian, 0.00% Pacific Islander, 0.53% from other races, and 0.94% from two or more races. 3.00%. were Hispanic or Latino of any race.

There were 1,962 households, 52.4% had children under the age of 18 living with them, 86.4% were married couples living together, 3.2% had a female householder with no husband present, and 8.7% were non-families. 6.3% of households were made up of individuals, and 2.0% had someone living alone who was 65 or older. The average household size was 3.26 and the average family size was 3.42.

In the village, the population was spread out, with 31.6% under the age of 18, 4.9% from 18 to 24, 23.0% from 25 to 44, 31.5% from 45 to 64, and 8.9% who were 65 or older. The median age was 41 years. For every 100 females, there were 99.3 males. For every 100 females age 18 and over, there were 94.8 males.

The median household income was $148,150 and the median family income was $153,996. Males had a median income of $153,996 versus $45,976 for females. The per capita income for the village was $62,185. 2.6% of the population and 1.8% of families were below the poverty line. Out of the total population, 3.1% of those under the age of 18 and 0.0% of those 65 and older were living below the poverty line.

Education
Long Grove is served by Kildeer Countryside Community Consolidated School District 96. There are two elementary schools (Kildeer Countryside) and (Country Meadows) and one middle school (Woodlawn) in the village. Adlai Stevenson High School is the local public High School, of District 125.

Some far north areas of Long Grove are served by Diamond Lake Elementary Schools and Middle School, but still is served by Stevenson High School.

Notable people
 Edo Belli (1918–2003), modernist architect. He resided in Long Grove at the time of his death.
 Martellus Bennett - the former tight end resided in Long Grove as a member of the Chicago Bears
 Daryl Hannah - the actress was born in Chicago, and raised in Long Grove
 Page Hannah - the former actress was born in Chicago, and raised in Long Grove
 Eddie Jackson - the safety resides in Long Grove as a member of the Chicago Bears
 Brad Maynard - the former punter resided in Long Grove as a member of the Chicago Bears

References

External links

Village of Long Grove official website
Historic Downtown Long Grove Business Association

Villages in Illinois
Villages in Lake County, Illinois
Populated places established in 1956